The Redhook Ale Brewery is a beer brewery operating out of Seattle, Washington, United States. It was founded in Seattle in 1981 by Paul Shipman and Gordon Bowker, and is currently owned by Portland, Oregon-based Craft Brew Alliance. Its flagship brewery, the Redhook Brewlab, is located in the Pike Motorworks Building in Seattle's Capitol Hill neighborhood. Redhook also operated a location in Portsmouth, New Hampshire, from the 1990s until June 2018, when it was rebranded under Cisco Brewers from Nantucket, Massachusetts.

Beers

Redhook currently produces several styles of beer marketed under distinct brand names. The brewery's flagship brand is Redhook ESB (5.8% ABV); its other beers include Long Hammer IPA (6.2% ABV), Big Ballard Imperial IPA (8.6% ABV), Bicoastal IPA (7.1% ABV), and also various seasonal offerings: My Oh My Caramel Macchiato Milk Stout (Spring - 5.5% ABV), Tangelic Halo Tangerine IPA (Summer - 6.2% ABV), Winterhook (Fall/Winter -  ABV varies year to year).

Redhook distributes its products through a network of wholesale distributors, Craft Brew Alliance Inc, and a distribution agreement with Anheuser-Busch InBev, Incorporated (which owns Craft Brew Alliance). As of March 2008, the brewery distributed its products in 48 U.S. states.

References

External links
 Redhook Ale Brewery
 Redhook Ale Brewery, Incorporated Corporate Profile

Food and drink companies based in Seattle
Manufacturing companies based in Seattle
Beer brewing companies based in Washington (state)
1982 establishments in Washington (state)
American beer brands